So Long, See You Tomorrow is a novel by American author William Maxwell. It was first published in The New Yorker magazine in October 1979 in two parts. It was published as a book the following year by Alfred A. Knopf.

It was awarded the William Dean Howells Medal, and its first paperback edition won a 1982 National Book Award. It was a finalist for the 1981 Pulitzer Prize. Michael Ondaatje described it as "one of the great books of our age". In 2016, it was included in a Parade Magazine list of the "75 Best Books of the Past 75 Years".

The novel is based on fact and has been described as an "autobiographical metafiction".

Plot introduction
So Long, See You Tomorrow is set in Maxwell's hometown of Lincoln, Illinois and tells of a murder that occurred in 1922. Fifty years later the guilt-ridden narrator recounts how the relationships between two neighboring families—the Smiths and the Wilsons—led to the murder of Lloyd Wilson and the suicide of Clarence Smith. Also the narrator recounts how he failed to support Cletus, a close school friend who was the son of the murderer, Clarence Smith.

Critical reception

On November 5, 2019, the BBC News listed So Long, See You Tomorrow on its list of the 100 most influential novels. In a starred review, Kirkus Reviews stated that the book was "major accomplishment: a wellnigh faultless, lacerating, and heartbreaking short novel." The book review site The Pequod rated the book a 10.0 (out of 10), saying, "Maxwell's story is personal but yet universal, and it leads us to recall our own childhood moments of regret and loss. This is a wondrous novel from start to finish."

Notes

References

1979 American novels
Novels set in Illinois
Fiction set in 1921
Novels set in the 1920s
Alfred A. Knopf books
Novels first published in serial form
Works originally published in The New Yorker
National Book Award for Fiction winning works
Lincoln, Illinois
Metafictional novels
American autobiographical novels
Novels republished in the Library of America